Motnišnica is a river in Slovenia. It is located in the central part of the country, 40 km northeast of Ljubljana, the capital of the country. Motnišnica is part of the watershed of the Danube River.

References 

Rivers of Slovenia